Molecular Cancer is a peer-reviewed open-access scientific journal covering all aspects of cancer research. 

The journal is published by BioMed Central and was established in 2002. The editor-in-chief is Chi V. Dang, who is also the scientific director of the Ludwig Institute for Cancer Research.

Molecular Cancer publishes research articles, reviews, and commentaries related to cancer biology, molecular oncology, cancer genetics, epigenetics, signal transduction, and targeted therapy.

Abstracting and indexing 
The journal is indexed in PubMed, and Scopus. The journal has a 2021 impact factor of 6.810, according to Journal Citation Reports.

References

External links 

 

English-language journals
Springer Science+Business Media academic journals
Publications established in 2002